Artsvik Harutyunyan (born 21 October 1984), better known as simply Artsvik, is a Russian-Armenian singer and songwriter. She represented Armenia in the Eurovision Song Contest 2017 with the song "Fly with Me" finishing in 18th place.

Life and career

Early life
Artsvik was born on 21 October 1984 in Kapan. When she was five years old, the family left Armenia for Russia, settling in Moscow. After graduating from high school, Artsvik studied to become a speech therapist at Moscow State Pedagogical University.

2013: Golos
In 2013, Artsvik became a contestant on season two of Golos, the Russian version of The Voice. Artsvik was eliminated in the battle rounds.

2016–present: Eurovision Song Contest 2017
In 2016, Artsvik was announced as a participant in Depi Evratesil, the Armenian national selection to find their entrant in the Eurovision Song Contest 2017. During her time on the show, she was a member of Essaï Altounian's team. She was announced the winner on 24 December 2016, and represented Armenia in the Eurovision Song Contest 2017 with the song "Fly with Me". The director of the music video on the song is Arthur Manukyan.

Discography

Singles

See also
Armenia in the Eurovision Song Contest
Eurovision Song Contest 2017

References

External links

1984 births
21st-century Armenian women singers
Armenian pop singers
Eurovision Song Contest entrants for Armenia
Eurovision Song Contest entrants of 2017
Living people
Moscow State Pedagogical University alumni
People from Kapan
Russian people of Armenian descent
Russian pop singers
Singers from Moscow
The Voice (franchise) contestants
21st-century Russian women singers
21st-century Russian singers